The Hawthorns School is an independent preparatory school for boys and girls aged 2 years to 13 years in Bletchingley, Surrey, England.

The headmaster as of 2015 is Mr Adrian Floyd.

Situated in a semi-rural location near Reigate, Oxted, Caterham, Westerham and Lingfield, the 35-acre site includes the listed Pendell Court alongside facilities for nursery and pre-prep children, as well as subject specialist centres.

History
Founded in 1926 by Mr Dudley A Bull, the school began as a boys' preparatory school with both day pupils and boarders. 'The Hawthorns' house, built in the 1880s, was situated at Gatton Point, on the London Brighton road, north of Redhill. In 1961 the school moved to Pendell Court, Bletchingley. Built in 1624 as a family home, it was later occupied by an order of nuns, the Wantage Sisters, until 1960.

The school became a co-educational prep school in September 1992. Boarding ended and The Hawthorns became an IAPS day school in 1994.

Notable Old Hawthornians
 Newton Faulkner
 Sir Peter O'Sullevan
Lord Bingham
 Adrian Greenwood, historian
Jason Roy, cricketer

References

External links

Preparatory schools in Surrey
Tandridge
Educational institutions established in 1926
1926 establishments in England